The Garvald Centres are a group of six affiliated but independent Scottish charities that support people with special needs and learning disabilities. It is based on the work of the Austrian esotericist Rudolf Steiner. The charities operate in the Midlothian, Scottish Borders and Edinburgh area of Scotland.

Founding

The Garvald School and Training Centre was founded near West Linton in 1944 by Dr Hans Schauder, his wife Lisl and others who decided to join him after having worked for some years at the Camphill community in Aberdeen. Dr Schauder himself was of Viennese origin and had fled Austria some years previously as he came from a Jewish family. Connected with anthroposophy, the medical and therapeutic work of Rudolf Steiner and with the group around Karl König, he had been among the founders of Camphill. After working at Garvald for some years he opened his own practice in Edinburgh and developed his own method of counselling until meeting the Dominican friar, Lefébure, with whom he wrote his best-known work Conversations on Counselling.

The Garvald school later became the Garvald Training Centre and later became six independent communities:

 Garvald West Linton, the original community established in 1944. 
 
 Garvald Edinburgh, established in 1969, runs a bakery and confectionery delivering to whole food shops, delicatessens and cafés and private customers, which was featured in the short film Breadmakers produced by Jim Hickey and Robin Mitchell and directed by Yasmin Fedda in 2007. The Mulberry Bush Shop sells artisan gifts produced in their workshops as well as books, art materials and craft produced by other suppliers. Craft workshops include a glass studio, joinery, pottery, puppetry, textiles and hand tool refurbishment. In 2007 it opened the Orwell Arts building in the city, where the former Dalry Primary School had been.

 The Engine Shed, an extension of Garvald Edinburgh founded in the 1980s.

 The Columcille Centre has a range of programmes like Edinburgh All, Columcille Esbank, Music for All, the Library project, Columcille Hall that is also available for rental and the Columcille Ceili Band, which featured in the documentary "About A Band" by Jim Hickey and Robin Mitchell. In addition it hosts the Makers Markets.

 Garvald Glenesk, a residential care centre established in 1998.

 Garvald Home Farm, a Biodynamic farm associated with Garvald West Linton established in 1987

Garvald social therapy

The centres are based on the work of Rudolf Steiner, in particular his ideas on social therapy expressed through the type of opportunities provided, the approach and the interdependence they try to create. It consists in giving structure and rhythm to member's lives, bringing people together to form a solid community through common activities or the celebration of events and by emphasising the quality of what the workshops produce so that everyone can take pride in achieving the best possible. The items produced should have a value or benefit to others rather than making things for their own sake.

They provide creative working environments focusing mainly on craft, catering, artistic skills and agriculture. Craft offers a wide range of possibilities for people to express creativity and be connected to nature, so there is much focus on different craft activities. In addition they engage in approaches such as the talking points methodology, which focuses on outcomes for service-users and carers and have themselves produced Talking Points tools which have been designed specifically for people with learning disabilities. In this way there is an opportunity for anyone coming to one of the Garvald centres to affect their environment, and the local and often wider community. They become needed by others and relied upon to sustain the creativity and range of goods, art and craft work. A range of therapies like eurythmy, creative speech, massage and various other therapeutic arts are also offered.

In addition to providing structured and creative working environments the majority of their studios and workshops have an enterprise focus, returning income to offset running costs. The opportunities they provide help people to gain confidence, particularly school leavers making the transition into an adult environment. The workshops teach skills that apply in mainstream employment or help an individual develop creativity over a longer period.

They have experience in supporting people with a range of needs and syndromes including autism, Down syndrome, fragile X syndrome, epilepsy, Prader Willi Syndrome and dual diagnosis as well as physical and communication difficulties. Members' ages range from sixteen to the mid seventies.

See also
 Camphill Movement

References

External links

Garvald West Linton Homepage
Website: Garvald Edinburgh
The Engine Shed Homepage
columcillecentre.co.uk
Garvald Glenesk Homepage
Garvald Home Farm
An Approach Based on Anthroposophy

Charities based in Scotland
Organizations established in 1944
Educational organisations based in Scotland
Anthroposophy
Therapeutic community
1944 establishments in Scotland
Special education in the United Kingdom